Zevenhoven is a village in the Dutch province of South Holland. It is a part of the municipality of Nieuwkoop and lies about 9 km northeast of Alphen aan den Rijn.

In 2001 the village of Zevenhoven had 1385 inhabitants. The built-up area of the village was 0.32 km², and contained 509 residences.
The statistical area "Zevenhoven", which also can include the peripheral parts of the village, as well as the surrounding countryside, has a population of around 2090.

Zevenhoven was a separate municipality until 1991, when it became part of Nieuwveen.

References

Populated places in South Holland
Former municipalities of South Holland
Geography of Nieuwkoop